Diamond Valley United Soccer Club is a soccer club based in Greensborough, Victoria, Australia.

Greensborough SC played at Willinda Park, Greensborough, until 1986 when that ground became dedicated to athletics. The local members then joined Heidelberg-Bundoora to create Diamond Valley United Soccer Club. Notably, Eltham SC also merged with the club in 1989.

The old Greensborough SC was taken over by a Cypriot community who moved the club to City of Moorabbin with the new name of Bentleigh Greens SC. The colours were subsequently changed from green and white to all green.

Diamond Valley United Soccer Club is currently (2023) in Victorian State League Division 3 North-West and plays its home games at Partingtons Flat, Greensborough.

External links
Diamond Valley United official site
Diamond Valley United Facebook Page

References

Association football clubs established in 1986
Soccer clubs in Melbourne
1986 establishments in Australia
Sport in the City of Banyule